We Care a Lot is the debut studio album by American rock band Faith No More, originally released in 1985 and distributed through Mordam Records. On the original vinyl release, the band is credited as Faith. No More. on the album's liner notes, back cover, and on the record itself.

Album information
The title track "We Care a Lot" was rerecorded for their follow-up album Introduce Yourself and released as their first single. This later version of the song was incorrectly listed as the original and the album Introduce Yourself was listed as the début in the sleeve notes for some subsequent releases, such as the 1998 compilation Who Cares a Lot?.

The band is known to have re-recorded only one song from We Care a Lot in the studio with current singer Mike Patton on vocals. "As the Worm Turns" was recorded during the Angel Dust sessions.

However, a number of live recordings of songs from this album with Patton on vocals have been released over the years.

 "We Care a Lot" 
 various "Falling to Pieces" singles
 Live at the Brixton Academy
 "We Care a Lot" (contains Patton's live version from Live At The Brixton Academy and Mosley's studio version from Introduce Yourself)
 "I'm Easy/Be Aggressive" CD2 single
 "We Care a Lot/I Started a Joke" (contains Patton's live version from Live At The Brixton Academy and Mosley's studio version from Introduce Yourself)
 various "I Started a Joke" singles
 "Mark Bowen"
 "I'm Easy/Be Aggressive" CD1 single
 "As the Worm Turns"
 various "Epic" CD singles
 Live at the Brixton Academy
 Angel Dust (Japanese edition)

A later recording of "We Care a Lot" (from the album Introduce Yourself) is used as the theme song for the show Dirty Jobs.

Production
The band initially started recording the album without backing from a record label and, after pooling their money, recorded five songs. This gained the attention of Ruth Schwartz (who was then forming the independent label Mordam Records) under which the band (after receiving the finances to do so) finished and released the album. It was the first official release for both the band and the label.

The album was recorded in a short space of time on a low budget. In a 2015 interview, bassist Billy Gould reflected, "There are probably things we could have done better, but at the same time I think that the performances were pretty damned good. And that had to do with us keeping focused and needing to work within those budget restrictions. We rehearsed quite a lot before we went in to record, so we were ready."

Release history

While released on vinyl and cassette in 1985, this album would not be released to buy as a CD until 1995 in Australia (on Mushroom Records) as a pink disc for the first pressing, and black disc for the second, to coincide with the tour for their fifth studio album King for a Day... Fool for a Lifetime, released that year. In 1996, it was reissued on CD, vinyl and cassette in the UK and Japan with slightly modified artwork, one being a purple disc. The CD reissue version of the album can be seen during a scene at a record store in the 1997 film Chasing Amy.

2016 reissue
The album was reissued by Koolarrow Records on August 19, 2016, and includes nine additional tracks, including three remixes, four demos and two live recordings from a 1986 show at the I-Beam, San Francisco. It was remastered by Maor Appelbaum

Music and lyrics
The third track "Mark Bowen" was titled after an early Faith No More/Faith No Man guitarist of the same name.

Critical reception

Select magazine, while also mentioning the roughness of production, said that the music is inexorable and "a lustful marriage of mutoid metal and dancefloor verve that owed nothing to anybody". AllMusic made repeated reference to the absence of future front man Mike Patton and criticized Chuck Mosley's vocals, calling him "often off-key, fairly monotonous, and colorless" but credited the album for having "lots of attitude", comparing it to early Public Image Ltd works.

Mike Patton labelled the album as "bad hippie music". However, his Mr. Bungle bandmate Trey Spruance was a fan. When Spruance joined Faith No More for their 1995 album King for a Day... Fool for a Lifetime, he suggested that the band return to the sound they had on We Care a Lot.

Track listing

2016 reissue bonus tracks

We Care a Lot - Deluxe Band Edition - Remastered by Maor Appelbaum

Personnel

Faith No More
 Mike Bordin – drums
 Roddy Bottum – keyboard
 Bill Gould – bass
 James B. Martin – guitar
 Chuck Mosley – vocals

Production
 Matt Wallace – producer
 Olga Gerrard – artwork, cover, graphics

Footnotes

1985 debut albums
Albums produced by Matt Wallace
Alternative metal albums by American artists
Faith No More albums
Funk metal albums
Post-punk albums by American artists